Lars Gunnar Raldo "Lasse" Björn (born 16 December 1931) is a retired ice hockey defenceman who played 217 games for the national team Tre Kronor. He was born in Stockholm, Sweden. He won nine Swedish ice hockey championships with Djurgårdens IF between 1950 and 1963, making him the only player ever to have won that many championships. He participated at nine IIHF World Championship tournaments, winning gold in 1953 and 1957 and three bronze medals. He participated in three Winter Olympics, winning one bronze medal in 1952. He was inducted into the International Ice Hockey Federation Hall of Fame in 1998.

He is the maternal grandfather of retired player Douglas Murray, a Cornell University alumnus who played defense for the San Jose Sharks, Pittsburgh Penguins, and Montreal Canadiens.

References

1931 births
Living people
Ice hockey people from Stockholm
Djurgårdens IF Hockey players
Ice hockey players at the 1952 Winter Olympics
Ice hockey players at the 1956 Winter Olympics
Ice hockey players at the 1960 Winter Olympics
IIHF Hall of Fame inductees
Olympic bronze medalists for Sweden
Olympic ice hockey players of Sweden
Swedish ice hockey defencemen
Olympic medalists in ice hockey
Medalists at the 1952 Winter Olympics